Tyrbastes is a genus of flowering plants belonging to the family Restionaceae.

Its native range is the south west of Western Australia.

Species:
 Tyrbastes glaucescens B.G.Briggs & L.A.S.Johnson

References

Restionaceae
Poales genera